Basavanagudi Aquatic Centre (BAC) is a premier swimming training centre located in Bangalore, India. At any given time, the Centre caters to more than 400 regular swimmers from different age groups at various levels. Many of India's international swimmers train here. The centre works full-time and has got the status of a professional Aquatic Centre. The staff consists of many well trained coaches under the head coach Pradeep Kumar.

Bangalore became the destination for talented swimmers of India in the 1980s as it boasted a swimming academy culture by several clubs and was supported by year round pleasant weather for training. In 1986 Basavanagudi Aquatic Centre was started and soon it became a sought after training centre for elite swimmers from all over India.

International Swimmers 

Some of India's notable international swimmers who have trained at this pool are Nisha Millet, Rehan Poncha, Aaron D'souza, Rohit Halvaldar, Mandar Divase, Talasha Prabhu, Arjun JP, Fariha Zaman, Shubha C, Arhata Magavi.

Events 

Notable events hosted at BAC:

 IWAS World Wheelchair and Amputee Games 2009 
 Junior National Aquatic Meet, 2010

See also 

 List of Indian records in swimming
 India at the 2008 Summer Olympics
 Nisha Millet
 Swimming at the 2009 Asian Youth Games

References

External links 
 

Swimming venues in India
Sports venues in Bangalore
1968 establishments in Mysore State
Sports venues completed in 1968
20th-century architecture in India